Our Lady of Guadalupe Co-Cathedral is a Roman Catholic cathedral located in the city of Belmopan, Belize.  It serves as a co-cathedral of the Roman Catholic Diocese of Belize City-Belmopan with the Holy Redeemer Cathedral in Belize City.  In 2009 a secular missionary priest from the United States, attached to the church, was embroiled in a sex scandal when he was sued by a man who claimed to have been sexually assaulted by him in the United States in the 1990s.

References

Cathedrals in Belize
Buildings and structures in Belmopan
Roman Catholic cathedrals in Belize
Churches in Belmopan